Mas-related G-protein coupled receptor member G (MRGG) also known as G-protein coupled receptor 169 (GPR169) is a protein that in humans is encoded by the MRGPRG gene. MRGG is an orphan G-protein coupled receptor.

References

G protein-coupled receptors